R.S.C. Anderlecht is a professional football team from Brussels, Belgium. The club was founded in 1908 and holds the record of Belgian championship titles. Players listed in this article are players who played in at least 100 games in the Belgian first division. The recordman of appearances in the first division for RSC Anderlecht is legendary player Paul Van Himst with 457 matches between 1960 and 1975. Joseph Mermans, nicknamed Le Bombardier is RSC Anderlecht record goalscorer with 338 goals in 384 matches, between 1942 and 1957. Dutch international Rob Rensenbrink, who scored 141 goals in 261 league appearances for Anderlecht between 1971 and 1980 was voted the club's greatest ever player in 2008.

Key
 Appearance and goal totals include matches in the Belgian Pro League only. Substitute appearances are included.
 Players are listed according to the date of their first-team debut for the club. Statistics are correct as of the end of the 2015-2016 season.

Playing positions

Players

References

Anderlecht players
Association football player non-biographical articles